Modern Classics: The Greatest Hits is a compilation album of music by English singer-songwriter Paul Weller, originally released in 1998. It featured most of his solo singles up to that point as well as a new track "Brand New Start".

Track listing 
All titles written by Paul Weller except where noted
 "Out of the Sinking" from Stanley Road
 "Peacock Suit" from Heavy Soul
 "Sunflower" from Wild Wood
 "The Weaver" from Wild Wood
 "Wild Wood" from Wild Wood
 "Above the Clouds" from Paul Weller
 "Uh Huh Oh Yeh" from Paul Weller
 "Brushed" (Paul Weller, Steve White, Mark Nelson, Brendan Lynch) from Heavy Soul
 "The Changingman" (Weller, Lynch) from Stanley Road
 "Friday Street" from Heavy Soul
 "You Do Something To Me" from Stanley Road
 "Brand New Start" Single release only
 "Hung Up" from Wild Wood
 "Mermaids" from Heavy Soul
 "Broken Stones" from Stanley Road
 "Into Tomorrow" from Paul Weller

A limited edition of the album came with a bonus 13 track live disc recorded at Victoria Park, London on 8 August 1998.

 "Into Tomorrow"
 "Peacock Suit"
 "Friday Street"
 "Mermaids"
 "Out of the Sinking"
 "Heavy Soul"
 "Wild Wood"
 "Up in Suzes' Room"
 "(Can You Heal Us) Holy Man?"
 "The Changingman" (Weller, Lynch)
 "Porcelain gods"
 "Sunflower"
 "Broken Stones"

the above live tracks have since been released as part the Weller at the BBC Digital Box edition.

1998 greatest hits albums
Paul Weller compilation albums